Abra Kadavar is the second studio album by German rock band Kadavar, released on 12 April 2013 by Nuclear Blast. The last album to feature bassist Philipp Lippitz and the first to feature bassist Simon Boutsloup who played on the last two tracks.

The album consists of nine songs, all composed by Kadavar, plus an additional bonus track, "The Man I Shot".

Reception

Eduardo Rivadavia's Blabbermouth review was predominantly positive, comparing Kadavar to fellow hard rock band Wolfmother. The review said that the album "shows a lot of heart, body and soul - all qualities that may help put all previously held suspicions to rest", and hailed "Come Back Life" and "The Man I Shot" as the best songs. In comparison to their debut album Kadavar, Rivadavia noted that the band had made "qualitative improvement on the songwriting and production."

Track listing

All songs written and composed by Christoph Lindemann, Christoph Bartelt and Philipp Lippitz.

Bonus Track

Personnel
Kadavar
Christoph Lindemann – vocals, electric guitar, synth
Philipp Lippitz – bass (tracks: 1-7)
Christoph Bartelt - drums, percussion, organ, backing vocals, production, engineering, mixing, mastering
Simon Bouteloup - bass (tracks: 8-10)

Additional personnel

 Upneet Neetu Bains - photography
 Joe Dilworth - photography
 Nathini Erber - photography

References

2013 albums
Kadavar albums